Deh Morgh (also Romanized as Deh-e Morgh and Deh Margh; also known as Deh Marg) is a village in Meyghan Rural District, in the Central District of Nehbandan County, South Khorasan Province, Iran. At the 2006 census, its population was 55, in 13 families.

References 

Populated places in Nehbandan County